Paschimbanga or Paschim Bangla (Bengali: পশ্চিমবঙ্গ) is the endonym (official native name) of West Bengal.

It may also mean:
Paschimbanga Bangla Akademi
Paschimbanga Ganatantrik Manch
Paschim Banga Natya Akademi
Paschim Banga Gramin Bank